This is a list of professional wrestling promotions in Mexico and lists both active and defunct "lucha libre" professional wrestling promotions from the 1930s to the 2000s.

List

See also

List of professional wrestling promotions
List of women's wrestling promotions

References

External links
Promotions

 
Promotions in Mexico
Mexico sport-related lists